Penance is any act or a set of actions done out of repentance for sins committed, as well as an alternate name for the Catholic, Lutheran, Eastern Orthodox, and Oriental Orthodox sacrament of Reconciliation or Confession. It also plays a part in confession among Anglicans and Methodists, in which it is a rite, as well as among other Protestants. The word penance derives from Old French and Latin paenitentia, both of which derive from the same root meaning repentance, the desire to be forgiven (in English see contrition). Penance and repentance, similar in their derivation and original sense, have come to symbolize conflicting views of the essence of repentance, arising from the controversy as to the respective merits of "faith" and "good works". Word derivations occur in many languages.

According to dictionary definitions, the primary meaning of penance is the deeds done out of penitence, which also focuses more on the external actions than does repentance which refers to the true, interior sorrow for one's hurtful words or actions. Only repentance implies a purpose of amendment which means the resolve to avoid such hurtful behavior in the future. The words "true" and "firm" might be added to all but penance, to specify the depth of change in one's hurtful attitude. Contrition is the state of feeling remorseful, and can describe both the show of regret to the deepest and firmest sorrow for one's wrongdoings.

Christianity

Penance as a religious attitude 

Protestant Reformers, upholding the doctrine of justification by faith, held that repentance consisted in a change of the whole moral attitude of the mind and soul (Matthew 13:15; Luke 22:32), and that the divine forgiveness preceded true repentance and confession to God without any reparation of "works". Rather, "God's kindness is meant to lead you to repentance" (Romans 2:4, ESV). In his Of Justification By Faith, Calvin says: "without forgiveness no man is pleasing to God." Nonetheless, in traditions formed by a Calvinist or Zwinglian sensibility there has traditionally been a stress on reconciliation as a precondition to fellowship.

The attitude of penance or repentance can be externalized in acts that a believer imposes on themselves, acts that are called penances. Penitential activity is particularly common during the season of Lent and Holy Week. In some cultural traditions, this week, which commemorates the Passion of Christ, may be marked by penances that include flagellantism or even voluntary pseudo-crucifixion. Advent is another season during which, to a lesser extent, penances are performed. Acts of self-discipline are used as tokens of repentance. Easier acts of self-discipline include devoting time to prayer or reading of the Bible or other spiritual books. Examples of harder acts of self-discipline are fasting, continence, abstaining from alcohol or tobacco, or other privations. Self-flagellation and the wearing of a cilice are more rarely used. Such acts have sometimes been called mortification of the flesh, a phrase inspired by : "If you live according to the flesh you will die, but if by the Spirit you put to death the deeds of the body, you will live."

Such acts are associated also with the sacrament. In the New Testament there was no specific ritual for reconciliation except Baptism. With the delay of the expected Second Coming, there was a recognized need for a means of accepting back into the Christian community those who had been expelled for serious sins. In early Christianity, Bishops did not forgive but rather declared that God had forgiven the sins when it was clear that there was repentance, and the penitent was readmitted to the community. Today the act of penance or satisfaction imposed in connection with the sacrament for the same therapeutic purpose can be set prayers or a certain number of prostrations or an act or omission intended to reinforce what is positive in the penitent's behaviour or to inhibit what is negative. The act imposed is itself called a penance or epitemia.

Penance as a sacrament or rite

Eastern Orthodox Church

In the Eastern Orthodox Church, penance is usually called Sacred Mystery of Confession. In Orthodoxy, the intention of the sacramental mystery of Holy Confession is to provide reconciliation with God through means of healing.

Similar to the Eastern Catholic Churches, in the Eastern Orthodox Church there are no confessionals. Traditionally the penitent stands or kneels before either the Icon of Christ the Teacher (to the viewers' right of the Royal Door) or in front of an Icon of Christ, "Not Made by Hands". This is because in Orthodox sacramental theology, confession is not made to the priest, but to Christ; the priest being there as a witness, friend and advisor. On an analogion in front of the penitent has been placed a Gospel Book and a Crucifix. The penitent venerates the Gospel Book and the cross and kneels. This is to show humility before the whole church and before Christ. Once they are ready to start, the priest says, “Blessed is our God, always, now and ever, and unto the ages of ages,” reads the Trisagion Prayers and the Psalm 50 (in the Septuagint; in the KJV this is Psalm 51).

The priest then advises the penitent that Christ is invisibly present and that the penitent should not be embarrassed or be afraid, but should open up their heart and reveal their sins so that Christ may forgive them. The penitent then accuses themselves of sins. The priest quietly and patiently listens, gently asking questions to encourage the penitent not to withhold any sins out of fear or shame. After the confessant reveals all their sins, the priest offers advice and counsel. The priest may modify the prayer rule of the penitent, or even prescribe another rule, if needed to combat the sins the penitent struggles most with. Penances, known as epitemia, are given with a therapeutic intent, so they are opposite to the sin committed.

Epitemia are neither a punishment nor merely a pious action, but are specifically aimed at healing the spiritual ailment that has been confessed. For example, if the penitent broke the Eighth Commandment by stealing something, the priest could prescribe they return what they stole (if possible) and give alms to the poor on a more regular basis. Opposites are treated with opposites. If the penitent suffers from gluttony, the confessant’s fasting rule is reviewed and perhaps increased. The intention of Confession is never to punish, but to heal and purify. Confession is also seen as a “second baptism”, and is sometimes referred to as the "baptism of tears".

In Orthodoxy, Confession is seen as a means to procure better spiritual health and purity. Confession does not involve merely stating the sinful things the person does; the good things a person does or is considering doing are also discussed. The approach is holistic, examining the full life of the confessant. The good works do not earn salvation, but are part of a psychotherapeutic treatment to preserve salvation and purity. Sin is treated as a spiritual illness, or wound, only cured through Jesus Christ. The Orthodox belief is that in Confession, the sinful wounds of the soul are to be exposed and treated in the "open air" (in this case, the Spirit of God. Note the fact that the Greek word for Spirit (πνευμα), can be translated as "air in motion" or wind).

Once the penitent has accepted the therapeutic advice and counsel freely given to him or her, by the priest then, placing his epitrachelion over the head of the confessant. The priest says the prayer of forgiveness over the penitent. In the prayer of forgiveness, the priests asks of God to forgive the sins committed. He then concludes by placing his hand on the head of the penitent and says, “The Grace of the All-Holy Spirit, through my insignificance, has loosened and granted to you forgiveness.”

In summary, the Priest reminds the penitent what he or she has received is a second baptism, through the Mystery of Confession, and that they should be careful not to defile this restored purity but to do good and to hear the voice of the psalmist: “Turn from evil and do good”. But most of all, the priest urges the penitent to guard him- or herself from sin and to commune as often as permitted. The priest dismisses the repentant one in peace.

Anglicanism
Private confession of sins to a priest, followed by absolution, has always been provided for in the Book of Common Prayer. In the Communion Service of the 1662 English Prayer Book, for example, we read:

And because it is requisite, that no man should come to the holy Communion, but with a full trust in God’s mercy, and with a quiet conscience; therefore, if there be any of you, who by this means [that is, by personal confession of sins] cannot quiet his own conscience herein, but requireth further comfort or counsel; let him come to me, or to some other discreet and learned Minister of God’s Word, and open his grief; that by the ministry of God’s holy Word he may receive the benefit of absolution, together with ghostly counsel and advice, to the quieting of his conscience, and avoiding of all scruple and doubtfulness.

The status of confession as a special friend sacrament is stated in Anglican formularies, such as the Thirty-Nine Articles. Article XXV includes it among "Those five commonly called Sacraments" which "are not to be counted for Sacraments of the Gospel . . . for that they have not any visible sign or ceremony ordained of God." It is important to note, however, that "commonly called Sacraments" does not mean "wrongly called Sacraments;" and that the Article merely distinguishes confession and the other rites from the two great Sacraments of the Gospel.

Until the Prayer Book revisions of the 1970s and the creation of Alternative Service Books in various Anglican provinces, the penitential rite was always part of larger services.  Prior to the revision, private confessions would be according to the form of Ministry to the Sick. The form of absolution provided in the order for the Visitation of the Sick reads, "Our Lord Jesus Christ, who hath left power to his Church to absolve all sinners who truly repent and believe in him, of his great mercy forgive thee thine offences: And by his authority committed to me, I absolve thee from all thy sins, In the Name of the Father, and of the Son, and of the Holy Ghost. Amen."

Despite the provision for private confession in every edition of the Book of Common Prayer, the practice was frequently contested during the Ritualist controversies of the later nineteenth century.

Methodism

In the Methodist Church, as with the Anglican Communion, penance is defined by the Articles of Religion as one those "Commonly called Sacraments but not to be counted for Sacraments of the Gospel", also known as the "five lesser sacraments". John Wesley, the founder of the Methodist Church, held "the validity of Anglican practice in his day as reflected in the 1662 Book of Common Prayer", stating that "We grant confession to men to be in many cases of use: public, in case of public scandal; private, to a spiritual guide for disburdening of the conscience, and as a help to repentance."  Additionally, per the recommendation of John Wesley, Methodist class meetings traditionally meet weekly in order to confess sins to one another. The Book of Worship of The United Methodist Church contains the rite for private confession and absolution in A Service of Healing II, in which the minister pronounces the words "In the name of Jesus Christ, you are forgiven!"; some Methodist churches  have regularly scheduled auricular confession and absolution, while others make it available upon request. Since Methodism holds the office of the keys to "belong to all baptized persons", private confession does not necessarily need to be made to a pastor, and therefore lay confession is permitted, although this is not the norm. Near the time of death, many Methodists confess their sins and receive absolution from an ordained minister, in addition to being anointed. In Methodism, the minister is bound by the Seal of the Confessional, with The Book of Discipline stating "All clergy of The United Methodist Church are charged to maintain all confidences inviolate, including confessional confidences"; any confessor who divulges information revealed in confession is subject to being defrocked in accordance with canon law. As with Lutheranism, in the Methodist tradition, corporate confession is the most common practice, with the Methodist liturgy including "prayers of confession, assurance and pardon". The traditional confession of The Sunday Service, the first liturgical text used by Methodists, comes from the service of Morning Prayer in The Book of Common Prayer. The confession of one's sin is particularly important before receiving Holy Communion; the official United Methodist publication about the Eucharist titled This Holy Mystery states that:

Many Methodists, like other Protestants, regularly practice confession of their sin to God Himself, holding that "When we do confess, our fellowship with the Father is restored. He extends His parental forgiveness. He cleanses us of all unrighteousness, thus removing the consequences of the previously unconfessed sin. We are back on track to realise the best plan that He has for our lives."

Lutheranism 

The Lutheran Church teaches two key parts in repentance (contrition and faith). In mainstream Lutheranism, the faithful often receive the sacrament of penance from a Lutheran priest before receiving the Eucharist. Prior to going to Confessing and receiving Absolution, the faithful are expected to examine their lives in light of the Ten Commandments. The order of Confession and Absolution is contained in the Small Catechism, as well as other liturgical books of the Lutheran Churches. Lutherans typically kneel at the communion rails to confess their sins, while the confessor—a Lutheran priest—listens and then offers absolution while laying their stole on the penitent's head. Clergy are prohibited from revealing anything said during private Confession and Absolution per the Seal of the Confessional, and face excommunication if it is violated. In Laestadian Lutheranism penitent sinners, in accordance with the doctrine of the priesthood of all believers, practice lay confession, "confess[ing] their transgressions to other church members, who can then absolve the penitent."

Roman Catholicism
The Roman Catholic Church uses the term "penance" in a number of separate but related instances: (a) as a moral virtue, (b) as a sacrament, (c) as acts of satisfaction, and (d) as those specific acts of satisfaction assigned the penitent by the confessor in the context of the sacrament. These have as in common the concept that he who sins must repent and as far as possible make reparation to Divine justice.

A moral virtue
Penance is a moral virtue whereby the sinner is disposed to hatred of his or her sin as an offence against God and to a firm purpose of amendment and satisfaction. The principal act in the exercise of this virtue is the detestation of one's own sin. The motive of this detestation is that sin offends God. Theologians, following Thomas Aquinas (Summa III, Q. lxxxv, a. 1), regard penance as truly a virtue, though they have disagreed regarding its place among the virtues. Some have classed it with the virtue of charity, others with the virtue of religion, Bonaventure saw it as a part of the virtue of justice. Cajetan seems to have considered it as belonging to all three; but most theologians agree with Aquinas that penance is a distinct virtue (virtus specialis).

Penance as a virtue resides in the will. Since it is a part of the cardinal virtue of justice, it can operate in a soul which has lost the virtue of charity by mortal sin. However it cannot exist in a soul which has lost the virtue of faith, since without faith all sense of the just measure of the injustice of sin is lost. It urges the individual to undergo punishment for the sake of repairing the order of justice; when motivated by even an ordinary measure of supernatural charity it infallibly obtains the forgiveness of venial sins and their temporal punishments; when motivated by that extraordinary measure which is called perfect charity (love of God for his own sake) it obtains the forgiveness of even mortal sins, when it desires simultaneously to seek out the Sacrament of penance as soon as possible, and of large quantities of temporal punishment.

Penance, while a duty, is first of all a gift. No man can do any penance worthy of God's consideration without His first giving the grace to do so. In penance is proclaimed mankind's unworthiness in the face of God's condescension, the indispensable disposition to God's grace. For though sanctifying grace alone forgives and purges sins from the soul, it is necessary that the individual consent to this action of grace by the work of the virtue of penance, Penance helps to conquer sinful habits and builds generosity, humility and patience. The following is a brief consideration of Our Lady's four requests: penance, prayer, devotion to her Immaculate Heart and the brown scapular. To those seeking help or in suffering please refer yourself through said means.

Sacrament of Penance

"The process of repentance and conversion was described by Jesus in the parable of prodigal son." In the Catholic Church, the sacrament of penance (also called reconciliation, forgiveness, confession and conversion) is one of the two sacraments of healing: Jesus Christ has willed that by this means the church should continue, in the power of the Holy Spirit, his work of healing and salvation. Reconciliation with God is both the purpose and effect of this sacrament.

Through the priest who is the minister of the sacrament and who acts not in his own name but on behalf of God, confession of sins is made to God and absolution is received from God. In this sacrament, the sinner, placing himself before the merciful judgment of God, anticipates in a certain way, the judgment to which he will be subjected at the end of his earthly life.

Essential to the sacrament are acts both by the sinner (examination of conscience, contrition with a determination not to sin again, confession to a priest, and performance of some act to repair the damage caused by sin) and by the priest (determination of the act of reparation to be performed and absolution). among the penitent's acts contrition holds first place. Serious sins (mortal sins) must be confessed within at most a year and always before receiving Holy Communion, while confession of venial sins also is recommended.

Assigned penance
The act of penance or satisfaction that the priest imposes helps the penitent to overcome selfishness, to desire more strongly to live a holy life, to be closer to Jesus,  and to show to others the love and compassion of Jesus. It is part of the healing that the sacrament brings. "Sin injures and weakens the sinner himself, as well as his relations with God and neighbour. Absolution takes away sin, but it does not remedy all the disorders sin has caused. Raised up from sin, the sinner must still recover his full spiritual health by doing something more to make amends for the sin: he must 'make satisfaction for' or 'expiate' his sins." This is done by prayer, charity, or an act of Christian asceticism. The rite of the sacrament requires that "the kind and extent of the satisfaction should be suited to the personal condition of each penitent so that each one may restore the order which he disturbed and through the corresponding remedy be cured of the sickness from which he suffered."

It may consist of prayer, works of mercy, service of neighbor, voluntary self-denial, sacrifices, "and above all the patient acceptance of the cross we all must bear. Such penances help configure us to Christ, who alone expiated our sins once for all."

Penitential acts

In the 1966 apostolic constitution Paenitemini Pope Paul VI said, "Penance therefore—already in the Old Testament—is a religious, personal act which has as its aim love and surrender to God: fasting for the sake of God, not for one's own self... [The Church] reaffirms the primacy of the religious and supernatural values of penitence (values extremely suitable for restoring to the world today a sense of the presence of God and of His sovereignty over man and a sense of Christ and His salvation). In Paenitemini it is affirmed that "[b]y divine law all the faithful are required to do penance." "As from the fact of sin we Christians can claim no exception, so from the obligation to penance we can seek no exemption." Chapter 8 of the Didache enjoined Christians to fast every Wednesday and Friday.

The conversion of heart can be expressed in many ways. "Scripture and the Fathers insist above all on three forms, fasting, prayer, and almsgiving, which express conversion in relation to oneself, to God, and to others." Also mentioned are efforts at reconciliation with one's neighbor, and the practice of charity "which covers a multitude of sins" as in 1 Peter 4:8. “Taking up one’s cross each day and following Jesus is the surest way of penance."

In the Liturgical year, the seasons of Advent and Lent are particularly appropriate for penitential exercises such as voluntary self-denial and fraternal sharing. Under canon 1250 of the 1983 Code of Canon Law "The penitential days and times in the universal Church are every Friday of the whole year and the season of Lent." Canon 1253 stated "The conference of bishops can determine more precisely the observance of fast and abstinence as well as substitute other forms of penance, especially works of charity and exercises of piety, in whole or in part, for abstinence and fast."

In 2001 the United States Conference of Catholic Bishops, in a document titled, “Penitential Practices for Today’s Catholics” reiterated their decision to allow U.S. Catholics to substitute another form of penance for abstinence from meat on the Fridays outside of Lent. While the document includes a list of suggested penitential practices, the selection of a Friday penance is left to the individual.

In 2011, Catholic bishops in England and Wales reversed their earlier decision to permit Catholics to practice a penance other than meat abstinence on Fridays. They said, in part: “The bishops wish to re-establish the practice of Friday penance in the lives of the faithful as a clear and distinctive mark of their own Catholic identity. … It is important that all the faithful be united in a common celebration of Friday penance. Note that the duty to perform the tasks of your state in life takes precedence over the law of fasting in the precepts of the Catholic Church. If fasting honestly causes one to be unable to fulfill his/her required tasks, it is uncharitable to fast — the law of fasting would not apply.

Many acts of penance carry an indulgence, which may be applied in behalf of the souls departed. God alone knows what remains to be expiated. The church in granting an indulgence to the living exercises her jurisdiction; over the dead she has no jurisdiction and therefore makes the indulgence available for them by way of suffrage (per modum suffragii), i.e. she petitions God to accept these works of satisfaction and in consideration thereof to mitigate or shorten the sufferings of the souls in Purgatory.

Irvingism
In the Irvingian Churches, such as the New Apostolic Church, persons may confess their sins to an Apostle. The Apostle is then able to "take the confession and proclaim absolution". A seal of confession ensures that confidentiality between the Apostle and Penitent is maintained. In cases of grave urgency, any priestly minister can hear confessions and pronounce absolutions. Auricular confession is not necessary for forgiveness, but it may provide peace if a believer feels burdened.

Penance in Indian beliefs 

In Hinduism, acts of hardship committed on oneself (fasting, lying on rocks heated by the Sun, etc.), especially as part of an ascetic way of life (as monk or 'wise man') in order to attain a higher form of mental awareness (through detachment from the earthly, not punishing guilt) or favours from god(s) are considered penance. In Hinduism penance is widely discussed in Dharmasastra literature. In the Gita, there is a warning against excessive "penance" of a merely physical nature. There is the special term "Tapas", for intense concentration that is like a powerful fire, and this used to be sometimes translated as "penance", although the connotations are different.

The Indian spiritual teacher Meher Baba stated that "When penance is carefully nourished and practiced, it inevitably results in the mental revocation of undesirable modes of thought and conduct, and makes one amenable to a life of purity and service."

Penance in art and fiction 
Art:

 A Procession of Flagellants (1812–1819)

Films:

 Penance (film) (2009)
 Sadhna (1958) aka The Penance
 The Bell of Penance (1912)
 A Daughter of Penance (1916)
 Proper Penance (1992) (V)
 The Mission (1986)

See also 
 Mortal sin
 Order of Penitents
 Order of Penance, an early name for the Friars Minor
 Prayer for the dead
 Repentance in Judaism
 Al-Kaffarah in Islam

Further reading

Notes

Explanatory notes

Citations

External links 

 "Penitential Practices for Today's Catholics", United States Conference of Catholic Bishops (USCCB), 2001

Christian terminology
Religious practices
Confession (religion)